Bouchette is a municipality in the geographic centre of the La Vallée-de-la-Gatineau Regional County Municipality, Quebec, Canada,  north of Gatineau. Its territory is along the shores of Gatineau River and western Thirty-One Mile Lake.

Agriculture is an important economic activity, along with outdoor tourism. It has less than 700 residents but approximately 1075 cottage owners.

There is a variety of services in Bouchette: school, post office, municipal services, grocery and hardware stores, restaurants, accommodation, construction contractors, camping.

History
The Bouchette Township was proclaimed in 1858 and the Township Municipality was formed in 1872. It was named in honour of Surveyor General of Lower Canada Joseph Bouchette (1774-1841).

The township of Cameron between the Gatineau River and Thirty-One Mile Lake was proclaimed in 1854 and named in honour of Canadian businessman and politician Malcolm Cameron.

In 1980, the townships of Bouchette and Cameron merged, forming the new Municipality of Bouchette.

Demographics

Private dwellings occupied by usual residents (2021): 347 (out of 629 total)

Languages:
 French as first language: 81%
 English as first language: 19%

Local government

List of former mayors:
 Réjean Carle (...–2009)
 Réjean Major (2009–2017)
 Gilles Bastien (2017–2021)
 Steve Lefebvre (2021–present)

References

External links

 Official website

Incorporated places in Outaouais
Municipalities in Quebec